The 1976–77 Divizia B was the 37th season of the second tier of the Romanian football league system.

The format has been maintained to three series, each of them having 18 teams. At the end of the season the winners of the series promoted to Divizia A and the last four places from each series relegated to Divizia C.

Team changes

To Divizia B
Promoted from Divizia C
 Minerul Gura Humorului
 Relonul Săvinești
 Olimpia Râmnicu Sărat
 Portul Constanța
 Tehnometal București
 Flacăra-Automecanica Moreni
 Minerul Lupeni
 Aurul Brad
 Armătura Zalău
 Minerul Cavnic
 Chimica Târnăveni
 Oltul Sfântu Gheorghe

Relegated from Divizia A
 Olimpia Satu Mare
 CFR Cluj
 Universitatea Cluj

From Divizia B
Relegated to Divizia C
 CS Botoșani
 Minerul Motru
 Minerul Moldova Nouă
 Cimentul Medgidia
 Metalul Mija
 Gaz Metan Mediaș
 Viitorul Vaslui
 Metrom Brașov
 Victoria Carei
 Tulcea
 Autobuzul București
 Unirea Tomnatic

Promoted to Divizia A
 FCM Galați
 Progresul București
 Corvinul Hunedoara

League tables

Serie I

Serie II

Serie III

See also 
 1976–77 Divizia A
 1976–77 Divizia C
 1976–77 County Championship

References

Liga II seasons
Romania
2